Jen Bilik (born July 21, 1969) is the founder and CEO of Knock Knock, an American book and gift publishing company.

Bilik grew up in California, then moved to New York and later on ended up in publishing. She co-authored books such as, Todd Oldham: Without Boundaries and Women of Taste: A Collaboration Celebrating Quilt Artists and Chefs.

Bilik majored in English literature and film studies at the University of Michigan.

References

1969 births
American book editors
American women chief executives
American women writers
Living people
Businesspeople from Berkeley, California
University of Michigan College of Literature, Science, and the Arts alumni
American publishing chief executives
American company founders
American women company founders
American publishers (people)
21st-century American women